Sergei Sergeyevich Sokolov (born 11 November 1986) is a Russian former professional football player.

Club career
He played in the Russian Football National League for FC Krasnodar in 2009.

External links
 

1986 births
People from Volzhsky, Volgograd Oblast
Living people
Russian footballers
Association football defenders
FC Energiya Volzhsky players
FC Krasnodar players
FC Orenburg players
FC Sokol Saratov players
FC Olimpia Volgograd players
FC Smena Komsomolsk-na-Amure players
FC Rotor Volgograd players
Sportspeople from Volgograd Oblast